Einar Laurentius "Linkan" Lindqvist (31 May 1895 – 26 April 1972) was a Swedish ice hockey and bandy player. He competed in the 1920 Summer Olympics. He died in Uppsala, Sweden. In 1920 he was a member of the Swedish ice hockey team which finished fourth in the Summer Olympics tournament. He played all six matches and scored three goals.

References

External links
 
profile

1895 births
1972 deaths
Ice hockey players at the 1920 Summer Olympics
IFK Uppsala Bandy players
IFK Uppsala Ishockey players
Olympic ice hockey players of Sweden
Swedish bandy players
Swedish ice hockey players